The 2000 Beach Soccer World Championships was the sixth edition of the Beach Soccer World Championships, the most prestigious competition in international beach soccer contested by men's national teams until 2005, when the competition was then replaced by the second iteration of a world cup in beach soccer, the better known FIFA Beach Soccer World Cup. It was organised by Brazilian sports agency Koch Tavares (one of the founding partners of Beach Soccer Worldwide). 

The tournament continued to take place in Rio de Janeiro, however for the first time the venue moved away from the sport's birthplace of Copacabana Beach, being staged around ten miles north at the Marina da Glória.

Defending champions Brazil won their sixth consecutive title, after defeating first time finalists Peru 6–2 in the concluding match of the tournament. Spain and Japan both finished inside the top four for the first time, the latter becoming the first Asian nation to do so at a World Championships.

Organisation
With the increase in the number of participating number teams in the previous year, the organisation remained the same at this World Championships, continuing with twelve nations who were split into four groups of three playing each other in a round robin format. The top two teams progressed to the quarter finals from which point on the championship was played as a knock-out tournament until a winner was crowned, with an additional match to determine third place.

Teams
The top finishing European nations in the 1999 Euro Beach Soccer League achieved qualification, along with the top finishers from South America in the 1999/2000 Americas' League. The other nations received invites.

Africa and Oceania were unrepresented.

Asian Zone (1):

European Zone (5):

North American Zone (1):

South American Zone (4):

1

Hosts:
 (South America)
Notes:
1. Teams making their debut

Group stage
Matches are listed as local time in Rio de Janeiro, (BRST / UTC-2)

Group A

Group B

Group C

Group D

Knockout stage
February 18 was allocated as a rest day.

Quarter finals

Semi-finals

Third place play-off

Final

Winners

Awards

Final standings

Sources

RSSSF
Roonba

2000
2000
2000 in beach soccer
2000 in Brazilian football